Phon Ngam  is a capital tambon (subdistrict) of Buntharik district, in Ubon Ratchathani Province, Thailand. In 2021, it had a population of 12,757 people. Neighbouring subdistricts are (clockwise from the south) Huai Kha, Bua Ngam, Nong Sano, and Kho Laen, as well as Champassack and Soukhoumma districts of Laos in the east.

History
The area was first settled in the early 1800s, but "Phon Ngam" village gained recognition in 1912 when the central government demoted Buntharik district to a minor district (king amphoe) and relocated the town center from Non Sung village on the west bank of the Lam Dom Noi River to Phon Ngam village on the east. The district was also renamed "Phon Ngam" in 1917.

Sukhaphiban Buntharik, a local government covering the town center in the Phon Ngam subdistrict, was created in 1956, two years before regaining district status. It was later expanded to cover a larger area in 1983, and upgraded to a subdistrict municipality in May 1999. Meanwhile, the area outside the subdistrict municipality has been governed by the Subdistrict Administrative Organization of Phon Ngam, which was upgraded from the subdistrict's council in 1997.

The westernmost region, consisting of 11 villages, was divided in 1969 to form a new subdistrict, Nong Sano. Later in 1985, seven villages in the western area were additionally separated to form a new administrative division, the Bua Ngam subdistrict.

Geography
The tambon is located in the eastern region of the Buntharik district; the western area is the low river plains of the Lam Dom Noi River (ลำโดมน้อย), while the eastern is highland of Dângrêk Mountains, the border of Thailand and Laos.

Administration
The subdistrict of Phon Ngam is divided into 14 administrative villages (mubans; หมู่บ้าน). The area is shared by 2 local governments; the township area was administrated by the Buntharik Subdistrict Municipality (เทศบาลตำบลบุณฑริก), which also covered some area of the neighboring subdistrict, Bua Ngam,  while the remaining was covered by the Subdistrict Administrative Organization of Phon Ngam (องค์การบริหารส่วนตำบลโพนงาม; Phon Ngam SAO).

As of the 2021 census, it had a population of 12,757 people with 4,328 households. The following is a list of the subdistrict's mubans, which roughly correspond to the villages.

References

Tambon of Ubon Ratchathani Province